Granite Township is a township in Morrison County, Minnesota, United States. The population was 480 at the 2000 census.

Granite Township was organized in 1902.

Geography

Demographics
As of the census of 2000, there were 480 people, 142 households, and 114 families residing in the township.  The population density was 13.3 people per square mile (5.1/km2).  There were 144 housing units at an average density of 4.0/sq mi (1.5/km2).  The racial makeup of the township was 99.79% White, and 0.21% from two or more races.

There were 142 households, out of which 43.7% had children under the age of 18 living with them, 77.5% were married couples living together, 2.1% had a female householder with no husband present, and 19.7% were non-families. 18.3% of all households were made up of individuals, and 5.6% had someone living alone who was 65 years of age or older.  The average household size was 3.38 and the average family size was 3.88.

In the township the population was spread out, with 34.0% under the age of 18, 10.4% from 18 to 24, 25.6% from 25 to 44, 24.2% from 45 to 64, and 5.8% who were 65 years of age or older.  The median age was 29 years. For every 100 females, there were 112.4 males.  For every 100 females age 18 and over, there were 121.7 males.

The median income for a household in the township was $47,813, and the median income for a family was $48,571. Males had a median income of $27,115 versus $21,429 for females. The per capita income for the township was $14,311.  About 6.9% of families and 9.8% of the population were below the poverty line, including 12.0% of those under age 18 and 43.8% of those age 65 or over.

References

Townships in Morrison County, Minnesota
Townships in Minnesota